Christine Evangelista (born October 27, 1986) is an American actress. She is best known for her supporting role as Sherry in the AMC zombie apocalypse horror television series The Walking Dead, along with her later reprising her role in the spin-off series Fear the Walking Dead and her main role as Megan Morrison in the E! drama television series The Arrangement.

Life and career
Evangelista was born in New York City and graduated from the Herbert Berghof School of Acting.

In New York, Evangelista performed in several off-Broadway shows and made appearances in television episodes of Law & Order, White Collar, Royal Pains, The Good Wife, Blue Bloods, and 666 Park Avenue.

She moved to a regular role in the single season of the Spike TV series The Kill Point in 2007. In 2013, Evangelista starred as a series regular in the short-lived ABC drama series, Lucky 7, followed with a recurring role as Allison Rafferty in the NBC series Chicago Fire.  As of 2016 she has a recurring role as Sherry on AMC's The Walking Dead.  As of 2017, while still appearing on The Walking Dead, Evangelista was starring as a series lead in the E! television series The Arrangement. She will be starring alongside Michael Fassbender, Jennifer Garner, Michelle Rodriguez, Lindsay Lohan, Maggie Q, Adam Copeland and Jean-Claude Van Damme in the action thriller film Harlem, set in the 1920s to the 1930s.

Evangelista has appeared in a number of films. She had the leading role in the independent film Red Butterfly (2014), and later had supporting parts in films The Intern (2015) and Bleed for This (2016).

Christine Evangelista is a first cousin of supermodel Linda Evangelista.

Filmography

Film

Television

Video games

References

External links
 

Living people
21st-century American actresses
Actresses from New York City
American film actresses
American stage actresses
American television actresses
1986 births
American people of Italian descent